Lee Ha-yool (born Lee Jong-ho on May 20, 1987) is a South Korean actor.

Filmography

Television series

Films

Music video

Awards and nominations

References

External links
 

1987 births
Living people
People from Incheon
Seoul Institute of the Arts alumni
21st-century South Korean male actors
South Korean male television actors
South Korean male film actors